Lanjarón is a municipality and town in the Alpujarras area in the province of Granada in Andalusia, Spain.

Lanjarón has a ruined castle and chalybeate baths.

This spa town is most famous, however, for its eponymous bottled water company, the first ever established in Spain, whose products are sold throughout the country.

On the 23rd of June, the town of Lanjaron celebrates its annual fiesta of San Juan, known as the biggest water fight in Spain. On the night of the 23rd, people from far and wide come to celebrate the midnight madness. For one hour, starting at midnight until 1am, the streets are packed with people and their buckets, water pistols, fire hoses and lorries filled with water.

Fountains 
Lanjarón has a series of fountains distributed through the streets and plazas. Most are accompanied by a short phrase or poem, usually by Federico García Lorca, and are used by locals and visitors for drink and rest. There numerous fountains in the town, these carry chlorinated water. Then there are three fountains with fresh spring water outside of town. Also note that the local spa owns its own fountains, which costs 1 euro to tap from. Here follows a gallery with all the town fountains:

References

External links
Lanjarón Township Consejería de Medio Ambiente de la Junta de Andalucía (Ministry of Environment of the Junta de Andalucia)
The Fiesta of San Juan 
Lanjaron, Spain Lanjaron - Visit Alpujarras: your holiday guide, travel information and rural accommodation
Lanjaron, Spain Lanjaron - Rural accommodation

Municipalities in the Province of Granada
Spa towns in Spain